Al-Amir Maurice Dawes (born September 28, 2001) is an American college basketball player for the Seton Hall Pirates of the Big East Conference. He previously played for the Clemson Tigers.

High school career
Dawes grew up in Newark, New Jersey and began playing basketball at the age of three. He attended The Patrick School, where he played behind Bryce Aiken as a freshman. Daves averaged 6.7 points per game as a sophomore, on a team that finished 28–4 and won the New Jersey Tournament of Champions. As a junior, he averaged 11.8 points per game, helping The Patrick School reach the Union County Tournament final. Dawes averaged 15.5 points, 4.3 assists, 3.1 rebounds and 2.1 steals per game in Nike EYBL play. He was considered to be a four-star recruit and the fifth-best prospect in New Jersey. Dawes committed to Clemson over offers from Rutgers, Providence, Seton Hall, St. John's and UConn.

College career
Dawes became the first freshman to be a regular starter at Clemson since Demontez Stitt in the 2007–08 season. He struggled with his turnovers early in the season and scored in double figures six times in Clemson's first 21 games. On February 22, 2020, Dawes scored a career-high 22 points in an 82–64 win against Boston College. He scored 18 points against Florida State on February 29, hitting the game-winning layup with a second remaining. As a freshman, Dawes averaged 9 points, 2.8 rebounds and 2.5 assists per game. He scored a sophomore season-high 21 points on March 6, 2021, in a 77–62 win against Pittsburgh. Dawes averaged 9 points per game as a sophomore, shooting 39.4 percent from three-point range. As a junior, he averaged 11.3 points and 2.3 assists per game. Following the season, Dawes transferred to Seton Hall.

National team career
Dawes was a part of the Clemson team chosen to represent the United States in the 2019 Summer Universiade in Italy. The U.S. received a gold medal after defeating Ukraine in the title game, and Dawes averaged 7 points per game during the tournament. In the 75–73 semifinal win against Israel, Dawes posted 16 points.

Career statistics

College

|-
| style="text-align:left;"| 2019–20
| style="text-align:left;"| Clemson
| 31 || 26 || 29.8 || .381 || .318 || .789 || 2.8 || 2.5 || 1.0 || .0 || 9.0
|-
| style="text-align:left;"| 2020–21
| style="text-align:left;"| Clemson
| 24 || 15 || 25.5 || .421 || .394 || .742 || 2.0 || 1.9 || .9 || .2 || 9.0
|-
| style="text-align:left;"| 2021–22
| style="text-align:left;"| Clemson
| 33 || 25 || 29.7 || .405 || .398 || .847 || 2.8 || 2.3 || .9 || .0 || 11.3
|- class="sortbottom"
| style="text-align:center;" colspan="2"| Career
| 88 || 86 || 28.6 || .401 || .372 || .803 || 2.6 || 2.2 || .9 || .0 || 9.8

References

External links
Clemson Tigers bio

2001 births
Living people
American men's basketball players
Clemson Tigers men's basketball players
Basketball players from Newark, New Jersey
The Patrick School alumni
Point guards
Universiade medalists in basketball
Universiade gold medalists for the United States
Medalists at the 2019 Summer Universiade